The Elliots Primary EoN or EoN Type 7 S.G.38 Primary was a training glider built in the UK shortly after World War II. It was an absolutely minimalist aircraft, consisting of a high, cable-braced wing connected to a conventional empennage by an open-truss framework, and was a copy of the German SG 38 Schulgleiter. Marketed to aeroclubs, the Primary EoN was also adopted in 1948 by the Air Training Corps and by the Combined Cadet Force under the name Eton TX.1. An example is at the Gliding Heritage Centre.

Operators

Royal Air Force
Air Training Corps
Combined Cadet Force

Specifications

See also

References

 
 

 

1940s British sailplanes
Glider aircraft
Aircraft first flown in 1948